Imanta Station is a railway station on the Torņakalns – Tukums II Railway. It's located near and named after the Imanta neighborhood of the Kurzeme District of Riga, Latvia. All electric trains of the line stop at the station.

History 
The station was unveiled as Zolitūde Station in 1894 to serve the inhabitants of the local area and to transport agricultural produce and was named after the nearby Zolitūde Manor.

The original station building, with some repairs, stood until March 2012, when it was demolished in preparation for renovations to the platform due to safety concerns. Major renovation works and the construction of a new station building began in November 2015. In 2016, the new building was unveiled.

Gallery

References

External links

Railway stations in Riga
Railway stations opened in 1894